Warren Harding "Sonny" Sharrock (August 27, 1940 – May 25, 1994) was an American jazz guitarist. He was married to singer Linda Sharrock, with whom he recorded and performed.

One of only a few prominent guitarists who participated in the first wave of free jazz during the 1960s, Sharrock was known for his heavily chorded attack, highly amplified bursts of feedback, and use of aggressive sustain to achieve saxophone-like lines on guitar. His early work also features creative use of a slide.

Biography

Early life and career
He was born in Ossining, New York, United States. Sharrock began his musical career singing doo wop in his teen years. He collaborated with Pharoah Sanders and Alexander Solla in the late 1960s, appearing first on Sanders's 1966 album, Tauhid. He made several appearances with flautist Herbie Mann, and an uncredited appearance on Miles Davis's A Tribute to Jack Johnson.

He wanted to play tenor saxophone from his youth after hearing John Coltrane on Davis's Kind of Blue on the radio at age 19, but his asthma prevented this. Sharrock said repeatedly, however, that he still considered himself "a horn player with a really fucked up axe."

Three albums under Sharrock's name were released from the late 1960s to the mid-1970s: Black Woman (which has been described by one reviewer as bringing out the beauty in emotions rather than technical prowess), Monkey-Pockie-Boo, and an album co-credited to Sharrock and his wife Linda, Paradise (work by which Sharrock was embarrassed, having stated several times that he felt it was not good enough to be reissued).

Career revival
After the release of Paradise, Sharrock was semi-retired for much of the 1970s and early 1980s. Undergoing a divorce from his wife and collaborator Linda in 1978, he worked as both a chauffeur and a caretaker for mentally challenged children. At producer Bill Laswell’s urging, Sharrock came out of retirement to appear on Material's 1981 album, Memory Serves. Starting in 1986, Sharrock was a member of the punk/jazz band Last Exit, with Laswell, saxophonist Peter Brötzmann and drummer Ronald Shannon Jackson. During the late 1980s, he performed extensively (and occasionally recorded) with the New York-based improvising band Machine Gun, as well as leading his own band. Sharrock flourished with Laswell's help, noting in a 1991 interview that "the last five years have been pretty strange for me, because I went twelve years without making a record at all, and then in the last five years, I've made seven records under my own name. That's pretty strange."

Laswell produced most of Sharrock's later recordings, including the entirely solo Guitar, the "metal-influenced" Seize the Rainbow, followed by one of his more universally accessible albums, High Life. Sonny was quoted as saying that this was his favorite band ever, with Abe Speller on percussion, Lance Carter on drums, Charles Baldwin on bass and David Snider on keyboards. This was followed by the well-received Ask the Ages, which featured John Coltrane's bandmates Pharoah Sanders and Elvin Jones. "Who Does She Hope to Be?" is a lyrical piece harkening back to the Coltrane/Davis Kind of Blue sessions that had inspired him to play in the first place. One writer described Ask the Ages as "hands down, Sharrock's finest hour, and the ideal album to play for those who claim to hate jazz guitar." Sharrock is also known for the soundtrack to the Cartoon Network program Space Ghost Coast to Coast with his drummer Lance Carter, one of the last projects he completed in the studio before his death. The season 3 episode "Sharrock" carried a dedication to him at the end, and previously unheard music that he had recorded for the show featured throughout most of the episode. "Sharrock" premiered as the 23rd episode on March 1, 1996, on Cartoon Network.

Death
On May 25, 1994, Sharrock died of a heart attack in his hometown of Ossining, New York, on the verge of signing the first major label deal of his career. He was 53.

Tributes
French guitarist Noël Akchoté's 2004 album Sonny II features tracks written, performed and inspired by Sharrock. 
In August 2010, S. Malcolm Street in Ossining was officially renamed "Sonny Sharrock Way". A sign was erected on Saturday, October 2, 2010. Sharrock was also inducted into Ossining High School's Hall of Fame.

Discography

As leader
 1969: Black Woman (Vortex)
 1970: Monkey-Pockie-Boo (BYG Actuel)
 1975: Paradise (Atco)
 1982: Dance with Me, Montana (Marge)
 1986: Guitar (Enemy)
 1987: Seize the Rainbow (Enemy)
 1989: Live in New York (Enemy)
 1990: Highlife (Enemy)
 1991: Faith Moves (CMP) duo with Nicky Skopelitis
 1991: Ask the Ages (Axiom)
 1996: Space Ghost Coast to Coast (Cartoon Network)
 1996: Into Another Light (Enemy) compilation

With Last Exit
 Köln (ITM, 1990)
 Last Exit (Enemy, 1986)
 The Noise of Trouble (Enemy, 1986)
 Cassette Recordings '87 (Enemy, 1987)
 Iron Path (Venture, 1988)
 Headfirst into the Flames: Live in Europe (MuWorks, 1993)

As sideman
With Ginger Baker

No Material (1989, recorded in 1987)

 Think About Brooklyn (Delabel DE 391 382, 1993)

With Pheeroan akLaff
 Sonogram (Mu Works, 1989)
With Roy Ayers
 Daddy Bug (Atlantic, 1969)
With Ginger Baker
 No Material (ITM, 1989)
With Brute Force
 Brute Force (Embryo, 1970)
With Don Cherry
 Eternal Rhythm (MPS, 1968)
With Miles Davis
 A Tribute to Jack Johnson (Columbia, 1970)
 The Complete Jack Johnson Sessions (Columbia, 1970 [2003])
With Green Line
 Green Line (Nivico, 1970) with Steve Marcus, Miroslav Vitous and Daniel Humair
With Byard Lancaster
 It's Not Up to Us (Vortex, 1966 [1968])
With Machine Gun
 Machine Gun (Mu, 1988)
 Open Fire (Mu, 1989)
With Herbie Mann
 Windows Opened (Atlantic, 1968)
 The Inspiration I Feel (Atlantic, 1968)
 Memphis Underground (Atlantic, 1969)
 Concerto Grosso in D Blues (Atlantic, 1969)
 Live at the Whisky a Go Go (Atlantic, 1969)
 Stone Flute (Embryo, 1970)
 Memphis Two-Step (Embro, 1970)
 Herbie Mann '71 (Embryo, 1971)
 Hold On, I'm Comin' (Atlantic, 1973)
With Material
 Memory Serves (Celluloid, 1981)
With Pharoah Sanders
 Tauhid (Impulse!, 1966)
 Izipho Zam (My Gifts) (Strata-East, 1969 [1973])
With Wayne Shorter
 Super Nova (Blue Note, 1969)
With The Stalin
 Fish Inn (1986 Mix) (Tokuma Onkou, 1986)
With Marzette Watts
 Marzette Watts and Company (ESP-Disk, 1966)

References

External links
 Bill Laswell discography (includes profiles on Laswell-produced Sharrock projects)
 Ossining, New York profile

1940 births
1994 deaths
Free jazz guitarists
American jazz guitarists
African-American jazz guitarists
American male guitarists
BYG Actuel artists
Avant-garde jazz guitarists
People from Ossining, New York
Last Exit (free jazz band) members
Enemy Records artists
20th-century American guitarists
Jazz musicians from New York (state)
20th-century American male musicians
American male jazz musicians
Machine Gun (band) members
20th-century African-American musicians
Spiritual jazz musicians